Ultimo Mondo Cannibale is the debut album by American band Impetigo. It was released in 1990 and was a major influence in the grindcore and goregrind scene. It is one of the first albums to use sound segments from horror films as intros for their songs (the title itself refers to the same named Italian cannibal movie by Ruggero Deodato). Another of the first bands to use this technique is Spanish grindcore band Machetazo.

The cover had to be changed because it was too graphic and violent. The original cover, and most of the Impetigo artwork, was drawn by band frontman Stevo Dobbins.

Track listing
"Maggots" (intro from Lucio Fulci's City of the Living Dead, 1980)
"Dis-Organ-Ized"
"Intense Mortification"
"Revenge of the Scabby Man" (intro from Ilsa, She Wolf of the SS, 1975) 
"Venereal Warts 3"
"Bloody Pit of Horror" (intro from Ilsa, She Wolf of the SS, 1975)
"Dear Uncle Creepy"
"Bitch Death Teenage Mucous Monster from Hell" (intro was created and done by Stevo in the studio, not from a movie)
"Zombie" (intro from Lucio Fulci's Zombi 2, 1979)
"Jane Fonda Sucks Part 2"
"Red Wigglers"
"Harbinger of Death"
"Unadulterated Brutality" (intro from Herschell Gordon Lewis's The Wizard of Gore, 1970)
"Mortado" (outro from a prank phone call done by the guys in Texas grind band Splatterreah a long time ago)
"Heart of Illinois"
"My Lai"
"Bad Dreams" (intro from Ruggero Deodato's Cannibal Holocaust, 1980)
"Who's Fucking Who?"

Notes
"Heart of Illinois" and "My Lai" are LP bonus tracks, "Bad Dreams" and "Who's Fucking Who?" cassette tape bonus tracks.

References

Impetigo (band) albums
1990 albums